Jordi Graupera i Garcia-Milà (born 1980, Barcelona) is a Catalan philosopher. He works on self-determination and international relations. He works as a philosophy professor at the Ramon Llull University in Barcelona, teaching on globalization, cultural traditions, and creative thinking. He also works teaching history of social thought at the Open University of Catalonia.

Biography 
He got his PhD in Political Philosophy at The New School for Social Research with a critique of the liberal theory of the state, and has taught at Saint Francis College, NYU, Parsons School of Architecture and Design, and Princeton University, where he did his post-doc. 

He has worked a journalist for several media in Catalonia and in Spain. In 2019, he ran for Mayor of Barcelona, but his platform (Barcelona és capital) did not get more than 5% of the votes, the representation threshold in Barcelona's city council.

His research interests focus on contemporary political theory, early modern political philosophy, and the history of culture in the Iberian Peninsula. He is the author of Una idea per Barcelona and La Supèrbia (available in English in The Seven Deadly Sins). He has also had a long career in journalism, as an op-ed writer, cultural critic, correspondent (in the US and Portugal), and political analyst. At Stanford, he has held the Josep Pla Visiting Professorship in Catalan Studies in the Department of Iberian and Latin American Cultures.

A long-form piece by Graupera about the final university course taught by philosopher Richard J. Bernstein was published in The New Yorker in January 2023.

Publications 
 Converses amb Xavier Sala i Martín (CAT: DAU, 2008 ) (in Catalan and Spanish) (ES: Planeta, 2010 )
 Cartes Ianquis de Carles Boix (collaborator) (A contravent, 2012 )
  Barcelona. La ciutat del present. (Ajuntament de Barcelona. 2013). ) 
 Una vida articulada per Josep Maria Espinàs (prologue) (La Campana, 2013 ) (in Catalan)
 Una idea per Barcelona (Destino, 2018)
 La supèrbia (Fragmenta, 2020), translated to English by Mara Faye Lethem and published as part of The Seven Deadly Sins

References 

1981 births
Living people
People from Barcelona
Journalists from Catalonia
Philosophers from Catalonia